The Quebec Six Days was a short-lived six-day track cycling race held in Quebec, Canada.

Only three editions were organized, from 1964 to 1966.

Winners

References

External links 

Cycle races in Canada
Six-day races
Recurring sporting events established in 1964
1964 establishments in Canada
Defunct cycling races in Canada
Recurring sporting events disestablished in 1966
1966 disestablishments in Canada